Posiłek  is a village in the administrative district of Gmina Krapkowice, within Krapkowice County, Opole Voivodeship, in south-western Poland. It lies 3km west of the Oder River. There is a Petrol/Service station in the village.

References

Villages in Krapkowice County